Clichés is the fourth solo album released by American pop rock musician Alex Chilton. It was recorded and released in 1993. Chilton recorded the album in New Orleans at Chez Flames, the studio of producer and recording engineer Keith Keller, who also wrote the song "Lies", featured on Chilton's album A Man Called Destruction.

In January 1992, Chilton was one of eight singer-songwriters (the others being Townes Van Zandt, Guy Clark, Eric Andersen, David Olney, Pat Mears, Paul K, and Tom Pacheco) who participated in a short tour of the Netherlands where each artist performed solo. For this series of concerts, Chilton performed much of the music that later became the album Clichés. He explained how the album came about to journalist Keith Spera in 1995:

Reception

Track listing
"My Baby Just Cares for Me" (Bergman, Vocco, Conn) – 3:44
"Time After Time" (Jule Styne, Sammy Cahn) – 2:36
"All of You" (Cole Porter) – 1:38
"Gavotte" (Johann Sebastian Bach) – 1:39
"Save Your Love for Me" (Buddy Johnson) – 2:49
"Let's Get Lost" (Frank Loesser, Jimmy McHugh) – 2:01
"Funny (But I Still Love You)" (Ray Charles) – 3:13
"Frame for the Blues" (Slide Hampton) – 3:34
"The Christmas Song" (Mel Tormé, Robert Wells) – 2:38
"There Will Never Be Another You" (Harry Warren, Mack Gordon) – 3:02
"Somewhere Along the Way" (Kurt Adams, Sammy Gallop) – 3:00
"What Was" (Ken Wannberg, Stephen Lehner) – 2:00

References

Alex Chilton albums
1993 albums
Covers albums
Ardent Records albums